Daniel Nestor and Nenad Zimonjić were the defending champions, but chose not to participate that year.

Travis Parrott and Filip Polášek won in the final 3–6, 7–6(7–4), [10–8], against Rohan Bopanna and Max Mirnyi

Seeds

Draw

Draw

External links
Draw

St. Petersburg Open
St. Petersburg Open - Doubles
St. Petersburg Open - Doubles